Gračanka or Graçanka  (also known as Gračanica/Graçanicë,  Грачаница) is a river in Kosovo. Its name is derived from Gradac, a toponym of fortified cities. It flows into the Sitnica near the settlement of Vragoli.

See also
Rivers in Kosovo

Notes

References

Rivers of Kosovo